Roveredo can refer to:

 Roveredo, municipality in the Moesa Region in the canton of Graubünden in Switzerland
 Roveredo, Ticino, village and former municipality in the canton of Ticino, Switzerland
 Roveredo in Piano, municipality  in the Province of Pordenone in the Italian region Friuli-Venezia
 Roveredo di Guà, comune  in the Province of Verona in the Italian region Veneto